The Royal Brunei Mausoleum is a Royal Mausoleum of Brunei located at Jalan Tutong, Bandar Seri Begawan, Brunei. The Mausoleum is the main resting place and burial ground for several Sultans of Brunei and members of the Royal Family. The Royal Mausoleum was opened during the reign of Sultan Omar Ali Saifuddin I who later became the first monarch to be buried in the Mausoleum when he died in 1795.

Before the establishment of the Royal Mausoleum, the past Sultans of Brunei were buried at Kianggeh Muslim Cemetery, Luba Royal Mausoleum, Pulau Chermin Royal Cemetery and Tanjong Kindana Royal Mausoleum.

Architecture
The large domed mausoleum building atop of a hill overlooking Kampong Ayer was built during the reign of Sultan Omar Ali Saifuddien III in 1965. The building's architecture is a combination of Islamic, Modern and local Malay styles.

Beside the main mausoleum, there were also 3 smaller domed mausoleum around the compound.
The mausoleum of Sultan Omar Ali Saifuddin I, Sultan Muhammad Tajuddin, Sultan Muhammad Jamalul Alam I and Sultan Omar Ali Saifuddien II.
The mausoleum of Sultan Muhammad Kanzul Alam and his descendants, located on a hill on the Royal mausoleum compound.
The mausoleum of Sultan Abdul Momin.

As of May 2021, a new expansion has been made for the Royal Mausoleum, which follows the same architecture as the initial one. This expansion has been made to accommodate more graves for the ruling royal family.

List of graves

Sultan of Brunei's graves
Four of Brunei Sultans were buried inside the main dome while the other six sultans were buried outside of the main dorm.

Outside the main dome
 Sultan Omar Ali Saifuddin I (died: 10 July 1795).
 Sultan Muhammad Tajuddin (died: 11 February 1807).
 Sultan Muhammad Jamalul Alam I (died: 10 November 1804).
 Sultan Muhammad Kanzul Alam (died: 10 May 1826).
 Sultan Omar Ali Saifuddin II (died: 18 November 1852).
 Sultan Abdul Momin (died: 29 May 1885).

Inside the main dome
 Sultan Hashim Jalilul Alam Aqamaddin (died: 10 May 1906).
 Sultan Muhammad Jamalul Alam II (died: 11 September 1924).
 Sultan Ahmad Tajuddin Akhazul Khairi Waddien (died: 4 June 1950).
 Sultan Haji Omar Ali Saifuddien Sa’adul Khairi Waddien (died: 7 September 1986).

Royal consort graves

Inside the main dome
 Raja Isteri Pengiran Anak Siti Fatimah binti Pengiran Tua Omar Ali, consort of Sultan Muhammad Jamalul Alam II (died: 7 March 1947)
 Raja Isteri Pengiran Anak Damit binti Pengiran Bendahara Pengiran Anak Abdul Rahman, consort of Sultan Omar Ali Saifuddien III (died: 13 September 1979)

Outside the main dome
Raja Isteri Pengiran Anak Siti Khadijah binti Sultan Omar Ali Saifuddin II, consort of Sultan Abdul Momin (died: 31 December 1875)
Pengiran Chendera Kesuma binti Pengiran Negara Indera, consort of Sultan Hashim (died: unknown)

Royal graves (members of the royal family)
Pengiran Muda Besar Pengiran Omar Ali Saifuddin ibni Al-Marhum Sultan Hashim Jalilul Alam Aqamaddin (died: 25 June 1905)
Pengiran Anak Siti Rauyah binti Sultan Hashim Jalilul Alam Aqamaddin (died: unknown)
Pengiran Anak Mohammad Salleh ibni Sultan Hashim Jalilul Alam Aqamaddin (died: unknown)
Pengiran Anak Sabtu ibni Sultan Hashim Jalilul Alam Aqamaddin (died: unknown)
Pengiran Anak Tinggal binti Sultan Muhammad Jamalul Alam II (died: unknown date)
Pengiran Bendahara Pengiran Anak Abdul Rahman ibni Pengiran Muda Besar Omar Ali Saifuddin (died: 27 September 1943)
Pengiran Anak Besar Bagol ibni Sultan Muhammad Jamalul Alam II (died: June 1945)
Pengiran Anak Safar ibni Sultan Hashim Jalilul Alam Aqamaddin (died: 24 June 1964)
Pengiran Anak Puteri Tengah binti Sultan Muhammad Jamalul Alam II (died: 24 August 1969)
Pengiran Temenggong Sahibul Bahar Pengiran Haji Mohammad bin Pengiran Abdul Rahman Piut (died: 25 May 1976)
Pengiran Pemancha Pengiran Anak Mohammad Alam ibni Pengiran Bendahara Pengiran Anak Abdul Rahman (died: 14 November 1982)
Pengiran Seri Maharaja Pengiran Anak Omar Ali ibni Pengiran Bendahara Pengiran Anak Abdul Rahman (died: 22 September 1983)
Pengiran Di-Gadong Pengiran Anak Kamis ibni Sultan Hashim Jalilul Alam Aqamaddin (died: 1986)
Pengiran Anak Puteri Hajah Besar binti Sultan Muhammad Jamalul Alam II (died: 16 September 1993)
Pengiran Bendahara Pengiran Muda Haji Muhammad Hashim ibni Pengiran Bendahara Pengiran Anak Abdul Rahman  (died: 27 December 1998)
Pengiran Jaya Negara Pengiran Haji Abdul Rahman ibni Pengiran Haji Abdul Rahim - Father of Pengiran Anak Isteri Pengiran Norhayati (died: 25 November 2002)
Pengiran Muda Muhammad Shafi Bolkiah ibni Pengiran Bendahara Seri Maharaja Permaisuara Pengiran Muda Haji Sufri Bolkiah
Pengiran Maharaja Laila Sahibul-Kahar Pengiran Anak Haji Muhammad Yusof ibni Al-Marhum Pengiran Pemancha Pengiran Anak Haji Mohammad Alam (died: 13 December 2004)
Pengiran Anak Hajah Siti Halimah binti Sultan Ahmad Tajuddin (died: 4 January 2009)
Pengiran Sura Negara Pengiran Anak Haji Muhammad Bey Muntassir Ibni Pengiran Indera Mahkota Pengiran Anak (Dr) Kemaludin Al-Haj (died: 25 November 2009)
Pengiran Indera Mahkota Pengiran Anak (Dr) Kemaluddin Al-Haj ibni Al-Marhum Pengiran Bendahara Pengiran Anak Haji Mohd Yassin (died: 9 January 2012)
Pengiran Anak Datin Hajah Siti Saerah binti Sultan Ahmad Tajuddin (died 4 November 2013)
Pengiran Babu Raja Pengiran Anak Hajah Besar binti Pengiran Anak Haji Metassan (died: 16 October 2016)
Pengiran Muda Haji Abdul Azim Bolkiah (died: 24 October 2020)

Non royal graves
 Ismail Omar Abdul Aziz – Brunei's First State Mufti (died 1994), the first and only non-royal dignitary to be buried inside the main dome.
Saiyed Ibrahim bin Saiyed Hassan Aal Taaher - Founder of Al Falaah School (died: 16 August 2000)
 Pengiran Setia Raja Pengiran Hj Jaya bin Pengiran Hj Rajid - Brunei's first local High Police Commissioner (died 18 October 2009)

See also
 List of Sultans of Brunei

References

Buildings and structures in Brunei
Mausoleums in Brunei